Dedra Davis (born 17 July 1973) is a retired Bahamian athlete who specialised in the long jump and sprinting events. She represented her country at the 1993 World Championships.

International competitions

Personal bests

Outdoor
100 metres – 11.31 (+1.3 m/s, Knoxville 1994)
200 metres – 23.04 (-0.1 m/s, Trento 1996)
Long jump – 6.49 (Buffalo 1993)
Indoor
60 metres – 7.44 (Madrid 1997)
Long jump – 6.71 (Indianapolis 1994)

References

1973 births
Living people
Bahamian female sprinters
Bahamian female long jumpers
Athletes (track and field) at the 1994 Commonwealth Games
Commonwealth Games competitors for the Bahamas
World Athletics Championships athletes for the Bahamas